Minjur railway station is one of the railway stations of the Chennai Central–Gummidipoondi section of the Chennai Suburban Railway Network. It serves the neighbourhood of Minjur, a suburb of Chennai, and is located 26 km north of Chennai Central railway station. It has an elevation of 8 m above sea level.

History
The lines at the station were electrified on 13 April 1979, with the electrification of the Chennai Central–Gummidipoondi section.

Traffic
About 20,000 people uses the station every day.

See also

 Chennai Suburban Railway
 Railway stations in Chennai

References

External links
 Minjur station at Indiarailinfo.com

Stations of Chennai Suburban Railway
Railway stations in Chennai
Railway stations in Tiruvallur district